Village Homes is a planned community in Davis, Yolo County, California. It is designed to be ecologically sustainable by harnessing the energies and natural resources that exist in the landscape, especially stormwater and solar energy.

History
The principal designer of Village Homes was architect Mike Corbett who began planning in the 1960s, with construction continuing from south to north from the 1970s through the 1980s. Village Homes was completed in 1982, and has attracted international attention from its inception as an early model of an environmentally friendly housing development, including a visit from then-French President François Mitterrand.

Sustainability

The 225 homes and 20 apartment units that now are the Village Homes community use solar panels for heating, and they are oriented around common areas at the rear of the buildings, rather than around the street at the front. All streets are oriented east–west, with all lots positioned north–south. This feature has become standard practice in Davis and elsewhere since it enables homes with passive solar designs to make full use of the sun's energy throughout the year. The development also uses natural drainage, called bioswales, to collect water to irrigate the common areas and support the cultivation of edible foods, such as nut and fruit trees and vegetables for consumption by residents, without incurring the cost of using treated municipal water.

References

External links
 http://www.villagehomesdavis.org/
 Village Homes information on the Davis Wiki.
 http://www.context.org/ICLIB/IC35/Browning.htm
 https://web.archive.org/web/20070609124520/http://arch.ced.berkeley.edu/vitalsigns/workup/siegel_house/vh_bkgd.html
 https://web.archive.org/web/20131110035906/http://www.earthfuture.com/community/villagehomes.asp

Documentary videos about Village Homes
 Global Gardener: Urban Permaculture feat. Bill Mollison (1991)
 GeoffLawton.com: Food Forest Suburb (2015)

Davis, California
Sustainable communities
Stormwater management
Renewable energy
Permaculture